Roman Jebavý and Igor Zelenay were the defending champions but chose not to defend their title.

Romain Arneodo and Tristan-Samuel Weissborn won the title after defeating Antonio Šančić and Ken Skupski 6–3, 1–6, [10–4] in the final.

Seeds

Draw

References
 Main Draw

Challenger La Manche - Doubles
2018 Doubles